Esther Lily Nkansah is a Ghanaian lawyer and a former Regional Minister of the Western Region from 1997 to 2001 under the Rawlings Government. In 2010, she was named in a 10-member Board of Bank of Ghana by President Atta Mills to assist the government with its Better Ghana Agenda. Mrs Nkansah is also the Lay Chairman of the Sekondi Diocese of the Methodist Church.

References 

Living people
Year of birth missing (living people)
20th-century Ghanaian politicians
20th-century Ghanaian lawyers
20th-century Ghanaian women politicians
21st-century Ghanaian politicians
21st-century Ghanaian lawyers
21st-century Ghanaian women politicians
Ghanaian women lawyers
National Democratic Congress (Ghana) politicians
20th-century women lawyers
21st-century women lawyers